The ten states of Alderney Members make up the legislature (the States of Alderney) of the island of Alderney. Half of the ten States Members are elected every two years for a four-year mandate. They are organised into three main committees: Policy and Finance, General Services, and Building and Development Control, each of which works under a different mandate and has a separate budget. There are also numerous smaller committees. A state meeting is held every month and is chaired by the island's president.

Current members

The current members were elected in the elections of 2022 and elections of 2020. They are:

See also 

 Elections in Alderney

Notes

References

External links
States of Alderney Official website
Eligibility criteria
The Alderney Journal

Alderney